Norman Barr may refer to:

 Norman B. Barr (1868–1943), American Presbyterian minister
 Norman Barr (priest) (1920–2010), Irish Dean of Connor